The Royal Norwegian Ministry of Government Administration, Reform and Church Affairs (FAD) was a Norwegian ministry.

It was established as the Ministry of Government Administration and Reform in 2006 by Stoltenberg's Second Cabinet. Its last leader was Rigmor Aasrud (Labour). When Solberg's Cabinet assumed office in October 2013, Jan Tore Sanner took over the ministry, pending its discontinuation from 2014.

On 1 January 2014 it was absorbed by Sanner's Ministry of Local Government and Modernisation.

The ministry was responsible for reform work, information technology, competition policy in addition to having the main responsibility for government employees and government organisation. The department must report to the legislature, the Parliament of Norway.

Organization
The ministry was divided into the following sections:
 Political staff
 Information Unit
 Department of Employer Policy
 Department of Competition Policy
 Department of Government Services
 Economics and Economic Analysis Unit

Subsidiaries
The following government agencies were subordinate to the ministry:
 Norwegian Data Inspectorate
 Government Administration Services
 Government County Governor
 Norwegian Competition Authority
 Norge.no
 Personvernnemda
 Norwegian Public Service Pension Fund
 Statsbygg
 Statskonsult (limited company)

See also

 MinID

References

Government Administration and Reform
Ministries established in 2006
2006 establishments in Norway
Ministries disestablished in 2014
2014 disestablishments in Norway